Nanjemoy Creek is a  tidal tributary of the Potomac River in Charles County, Maryland, United States, located between Cedar Point Neck and Tayloe Neck.

There is a large great blue heron rookery located at Nanjemoy Creek.

Blossom Point, a part of Harry Diamond Laboratories, and operated by the U.S. Army, is located on Cedar Point Neck, and unexploded ordnance (UXO) may be present within firing fans, which extend into both Nanjemoy Creek and the Potomac River.

The rural community of Nanjemoy is in the area around Nanjemoy Creek.

Variant names
The following variant names have been listed on the Geographic Names Information System by the United States Geological Survey.
Auon Riuer
Avon Creek
Nancemy Creek
Nangemie Creeke
Nangemy Creeke
Nanjamy Creeke
Nanjemy Creek
Nanjemy Creeke
Nonjamy Creeke
Nonjemy Creek

See also
List of Maryland rivers

References

External links
 Nanjemoy Creek Environmental Education Center

Rivers of Maryland
Rivers of Charles County, Maryland
Tributaries of the Potomac River